Gongliu County as the official romanized name, also transliterated from Uyghur as Tokkuztara County, is a county situated within the Xinjiang Uyghur Autonomous Region and is under the administration of the Ili Kazakh Autonomous Prefecture. According to the 2002 census, it has a population of 160,000.

Name
The place was originally named Tokkuztara, meaning "nine streams" because branches of the Ili River merged in the area. When a county was set up in 1932, Gongliu was chosen as the official name, which is an abbreviation of Gonggu Changliu (""), literally Stability and Long-lasting.

Administrative divisions
There is one township and seven villages. There are six towns in Tokkuztara County, which are as follows:

Note:
1. On October 21, 2014, with the approval of the Xinjiang Uygur Autonomous Region People's Government, the original Dongmahalla Township was renamed Dongmahalla Town. 
2. In 2013, with the approval of the Xinjiang Uygur Autonomous Region People's Government, the original Agarsin Township was renamed Agarsin Town.
3. On July 13, 2016, with the approval of the People's Government of the Xinjiang Uygur Autonomous Region, the original Tikirik Township was renamed Tikirik Town.
4. On January 24, 2013, with the approval of the Xinjiang Uygur Autonomous Region People's Government, it was renamed the original "Muhur Township" Koldeneng Town.

There are 2 townships in Tokkuztara County, which are as follows:

Climate

References

County-level divisions of Xinjiang
Ili Kazakh Autonomous Prefecture